Two vessels of the Royal Navy have been named HMS Pendennis:
  was a 70-gun third-rate launched in 1679 and wrecked in 1689
  was a 48-gun fourth-rate launched in 1695 and captured by the French 50-gun Protée in 1705

References

 

Royal Navy ship names